Lord George Charles Gordon-Lennox (22 October 1829 – 22 February 1877), was a British Conservative politician.

Background
Gordon-Lennox was the fifth son of Charles Gordon-Lennox, 5th Duke of Richmond and Lady Caroline, daughter of Field Marshal Henry Paget, 1st Marquess of Anglesey. Charles Gordon-Lennox, 6th Duke of Richmond, Lord Henry Lennox and Lord Alexander Gordon-Lennox were his elder brothers.

Political career
Gordon-Lennox sat as Member of Parliament for Lymington between 1860 and 1874. He was also a Lieutenant in the Royal Horse Guards.

Family
Gordon-Lennox married Minnie Augusta, daughter of William Henry Palmer and widow of Edwin Adolphus Cook, in 1875. They had no children. He died in February 1877, aged 47. Lady George Gordon-Lennox remained a widow until her death in September 1913.

References

External links 
 

1829 births
1877 deaths
Younger sons of dukes
George
Members of the Parliament of the United Kingdom for English constituencies
UK MPs 1859–1865
UK MPs 1865–1868
UK MPs 1868–1874